Andre Marriner (born 1 January 1971) is an English professional football referee based in Solihull, West Midlands. He is a member of the Birmingham County Football Association.

In 2005, Marriner was promoted to the list of Select Group Referees who officiate primarily in the Premier League. He also refereed for FIFA between 2009 & 2017. In May 2013 he took charge of the FA Cup final, the highest domestic honour for a referee in England.

Refereeing career

Early career
Marriner began refereeing in 1992, by chance when he was asked to cover for a referee who did not turn up for a local match, and progressed via the Birmingham Amateur Football League and the Southern Football League to become a Football League assistant referee in 2000.

He was appointed to the Football League list of referees in 2003, and he was given his first Premier League appointment on 13 November 2004, a 4–0 home win by Charlton Athletic over Norwich City.

Professional career
Marriner was promoted to the Select Group of professional referees in 2005. In the same year, he refereed the FA Youth Cup final between Southampton and Ipswich Town, with the latter winning 3–2.

He was appointed fourth official for the 2008 FA Community Shield match, which was won by Manchester United who defeated Portsmouth on penalties after a 0–0 draw in normal time. Peter Walton was the referee.

In December 2008 it was announced that Marriner, at the age of 37 and along with 26-year-old Stuart Attwell, would be invited to join FIFA's list of international referees for 2009. Marriner was called up to officiate at the elite qualification for the 2009 Euro Under-19s Championship, taking charge of Norway's 1–1 draw with Romania in Saint-Lô, and Romania's 3–0 defeat to France, also in Saint-Lô.

He was appointed to the 2010 Football League Championship play-off final between Blackpool and Cardiff City at Wembley Stadium. Blackpool won the match 3–2, all five goals having been scored in the first half, securing the club's return to the Premier League for the first time since 1970. Marriner did not issue any cards during the match.

In a fixture between Arsenal and Liverpool in April 2011, Marriner notably awarded the latest-ever penalty kick in the history of the Premier League. The match was goalless until Marriner awarded Arsenal a penalty in the seventh minute of second-half stoppage time, and four minutes later awarded a second penalty to Liverpool. Both were converted, the latter in the 102nd minute which also became the League's latest-ever goal.

In May 2013 he refereed the FA Cup final between Manchester City and Wigan Athletic at Wembley Stadium. Marriner described the appointment as a "great honour". Wigan won the final 1–0, with a stoppage time goal from Ben Watson. Marriner dismissed City's Pablo Zabaleta six minutes from time for a second yellow card offence.

In March 2014, during Chelsea's 6–0 win over Arsenal, Marriner wrongly sent off Kieran Gibbs in the 15th minute, for a deliberate handball actually committed by Alex Oxlade-Chamberlain.

Statistics

Statistics are available for all competitions. No records are available prior to 2002–03.

References

External links

 
 
 
 

1971 births
English football referees
Living people
People from Sheldon
FA Cup Final referees
Premier League referees